Watch How the People Dancing: Unity Sounds from the London Dancehall 1986–1989 is a compilation album released on 28 January 2003 through Honest Jon's record label. The album features dancehall singles released through British Unity Sounds record label in 1980s and documents the genre's transition into modern digital dancehall, focusing on the British scene.

Background
The album was recorded by the Unity Sound label workers after the introduction of the early digital sound system. The rhythm tracks were recorded by a Casio keyboard and a four-track cassette recorder, which were later supplemented by vocals and overdubs in the studio. Prior to being released as singles, all the tracks here were tested on the Unity sound system.

Majority of the tracks also contain an instrumental version. The tracks "Pick a Sound" by Selah Collins and "Watch How the People Dancing" by Kenny Knots became early hits in the scene.

Critical reception

The compilation generally received positive reviews from critics. AllMusic critic Chris Nickson described the album's style as "true street-level British reggae from the dawn of the digital era, and all surprisingly good, given that none of the people involved were really musicians." Entertainment Weekly stated that the album is "not the best of the era (see Barrington Levy), but a sweet, bouncy snapshot of a pungent regional scene."

Track listing

Personnel
 Ruddy Ranks – production, composition
 Red Eye – production, composition
 Ribs – production, composition
 Will Bankhead – artwork, photography 
 Mark Ainley – compiling
 Tom Benson – compiling
 Trevor Lewis – photography
 Moritz von Oswald – mastering

References

External links
 

2003 compilation albums
Reggae compilation albums
Record label compilation albums
Regional music compilation albums
Dancehall albums